is a Japanese comedian who is a member of the Takeshi Gundan.

Rusher Itamae is represented with Office Kitano. He graduated from Matsudo Municipal Kawarazuka Elementary School, Matsudo Municipal Tokiwadaira Junior High School, and Municipal Matsudo High School. Rusher Itamae's older brother was Uganda Tora whom he married his sister.

Filmography

TV series

Former appearances

Radio

Advertisements

References

External links

 
 

Japanese comedians
1963 births
Living people
People from Chiba Prefecture